This is a complete list of the people who have served as lieutenant governor of the U.S. state of New York.

The lieutenant governor of New York, who is the president of the New York State Senate, is the second-highest position in the New York state government; the officeholder is first in line to succeed to the governorship should the governor resign, die or be removed from office via impeachment conviction. The lieutenant governor also assumes the gubernatorial powers and duties as acting governor if the governor is unable to perform those powers and duties.

New York currently has the highest-paid lieutenant governor in the country, with an annual salary of $220,000 as of 2021. As of May 25, 2022, Antonio Delgado is lieutenant governor.

List of lieutenant governors of New York

See also
Lieutenant Governor of New York 
New York gubernatorial elections (to see the election results for the Lieutenant Governor of New York) 
Politics of New York (state)
Second Spouses and Partners of New York

References

Lieutenant Governors of New York (state)